The 2016 North Carolina Democratic presidential primary took place on March 15 in the U.S. state of North Carolina as one of the Democratic Party's primaries ahead of the 2016 presidential election.

On the same day, the Democratic Party held primaries in Florida, Illinois, Missouri, and Ohio, while the Republican Party held primaries in the same five states, including their own North Carolina primary, plus the Northern Mariana Islands.

Clinton easily won the primary. She had the in-state backing of Rep. G.K. Butterfield, the chairman of the Congressional Black Caucus, as well as Reps. Alma Adams and David Price. Sanders, meanwhile, did not have any endorsements from members of Congress representing the state. Clinton won 80% of African Americans.

Opinion polling

Results

Results by county

Analysis 
After North Carolina had sealed the deal on Clinton's dying 2008 presidential effort eight years prior by handing a double-digit win to Barack Obama, Hillary Clinton managed a commanding 13-percentage-point-victory in North Carolina over Bernie Sanders in 2016. Clinton won both men 48-47, and women 59-37; she won both married and unmarried women voters in the state. While Sanders won 59–40 with younger voters, and 52-43 with white voters, Clinton won 64–30 with older voters and 80-19 with African American voters. Clinton swept all educational attainment levels and all income levels except those who made between $50k and $100k per year. Clinton won Democrats 65-34, but lost Independents 58-34 to Sanders. Clinton won among liberals, moderates, and conservatives in the Old North State.

Clinton won in urban, Suburban, and rural areas of the state. She won Raleigh-Durham 55-42, the Charlotte area 60-39, Piedmont and central North Carolina 60-31, and Eastern North Carolina 58-34. Sanders performed strongly in Western North Carolina, which is whiter, conservative, more rural and considered to be part of Appalachia, winning 52–44. Outside of the western part of the state, Sanders won only three counties: New Hanover, home to Wilmington; the state's eighth most populated city, Dare, and Orange, the latter of which is home to the University of North Carolina at Chapel Hill.

References

North Carolina
Democratic primary
2016